"The Eddie", also known as The Eddie Aikau Big Wave Invitational, is a big wave surfing tournament held at Waimea Bay on the north shore of Oahu, Hawaii.  The tournament is named for native Hawaiian, champion big wave surfer, and life-saving Waimea Bay lifeguard, Eddie Aikau.  Created in 1984 at nearby Sunset Beach, the invitational tournament moved to the notoriously big waved Waimea Bay, where Aikau's family maintains an ancestral tradition as caretakers of the Waimea Valley. It was formerly known as the Quiksilver in Memory of Eddie Aikau after its sponsor Quiksilver, but the company and the Aikau family could not agree to terms for a new contract after the previous one expired in 2016.

Tournament format
The tournament is known for a unique requirement that open-ocean swells reach a minimum height of  before the competition can be held. As a result of this requirement, the tournament has only been held ten times during the history of the event, most recently on January 22, 2023.

The competition window is between December 1 and the last day of February annually, when winter storms in the North Pacific provide the energy for big waves on Oahu's North Shore. Each day, surf conditions, ocean swells, and weather forecasts are monitored by oceanographers, meteorologists, and big wave surfing experts, and provide input to the Tournament Director, who is responsible for making the official call to run the tournament. If the minimum conditions are not met during the competition window, the event is not held that year, and the process repeats itself the following December.

Each year, 28 to 40 surfers, chosen by polling among their peers, are invited to Waimea Bay to participate in the opening ceremony "Blessing of Eddie Aikau" on the first Thursday of December. These surfers then await an Official Call during the competition window, at which point they have 12 hours to arrive at Waimea Bay to check in the morning of the competition.  Participants compete in two rounds of about four or five waves each during the competition day, which is generally from 8:00 a.m. to 5:00 p.m. Each wave in the first round lasts 45 minutes, and 50 minutes in the second round. Surfers' four best-scoring waves over both rounds make up their total score.

Participants are not allowed to use personal watercraft to tow themselves into the waves; they must paddle out into the waves entirely under their own power.

Eddie Aikau's brother, Clyde Aikau, won the second "Eddie" in 1986.  Before Eddie's death, at 31 in 1978, the two brothers had surfed together and competitively for a number of years.  They are the only native Hawaiians to win the Duke Kahanamoku Invitational Surfing Championship.

The 2023 event included female surfers for the first time in the history of the contest.

Tournament winners
January 3, 1985 - Denton Miyamura (age 24)
December 21, 1986 - Clyde Aikau (age 30)
January 21, 1990 - Keone Downing (age 36)
January 1, 1999 - Noah Johnson (age 25)
January 12, 2001 - Ross Clarke-Jones (age 34)
January 8, 2002 - Kelly Slater (age 29)
December 15, 2004 - Bruce Irons (age 25)
December 8, 2009 - Greg Long (age 25)
February 25, 2016 - John John Florence (age 23)
January 22, 2023 - Luke Shepardson (age 27)

Notes

References

External links

Big wave surfing
Surfing competitions in Hawaii
Surfing in Hawaii
Annual events in Hawaii
Recurring sporting events established in 1984
1984 establishments in Hawaii